Stockton on Teme is a village and civil parish in the Malvern Hills District in  the county of Worcestershire, England. It is close to the River Teme and is noted for its 12th century Norman church with  an unusual circular graveyard.(photo).

The current house on Pensax Road called Stockton Lodge was changed from Wharf Cottage (2006) which was previously 2 workers cottages called 96 pensax road which were made into a single dwelling called Wharf Cottage.

History

Stockton on Teme was in the upper division of Doddingtree Hundred.

The Rev Theophilus Houlbrooke FRSE was rector of  the church from 1770 until 1784 and Rev Thomas Pearson was rector from 1808 to 1828. He then moved to become the Rector at Great Witley where from 1843 to 1846 he was also the chaplain to Queen Adelaide who at that time was living at Witley Court.

References

External links

 Stockton on Teme official web site.
 on Teme-st-andrew/ St Andrew's Church web site

Villages in Worcestershire